Sibuco-Vitali is a dialect of Pangutaran Sama, a language spoken in the Philippines. It has approximately 11,000 speakers and is spoken in the Zamboanga Peninsula, 50 km north of Zamboanga City.

References 

Dialects